Hello Cruel World may refer to:

 Hello Cruel World (Tall Dwarfs album), 1988
 Hello Cruel World (Sole and the Skyrider Band album), 2011
 "Hello, Cruel World" (Supernatural), an episode of American TV series Supernatural
 Hello Cruel World, a 2012 album by Gretchen Peters
 "Hello Cruel World", a song by E from the 1992 album A Man Called E
 "Hello Cruel World", a song by Bad Religion from the 2013 album True North